The Mary Ann Shadd Cary House is a historic residence located at 1421 W Street, Northwest in Washington, D.C.  From 1881 to 1885, it was the home of Mary Ann Shadd Cary (1823–93), a writer and abolitionist who was one of the first African American female journalists in North America, and who became one of the first black female lawyers after the American Civil War.  The house was declared a National Historic Landmark on December 8, 1976, and was listed on the National Register of Historic Places.  It also is a contributing property to the Greater U Street Historic District.

Description and history
The Mary Ann Shadd Cary House is located on the southern fringe of Washington's Columbia Heights, on the north side of W Street between 14th Street and Florida Avenue.  It is one of a series of brick row houses, probably built in the 1860s.  It is three stories in height and three bays wide, with a corbelled cornice, and projecting brick hoods around its windows.  It was from 1881 to 1885 the home of Mary Ann Shadd Cary.

Mary Ann Shadd was born a free black in the slave state of Delaware, and was educated in Pennsylvania.  Her father was active in anti-slavery circles, sheltering fugitive slaves in the family home.  At first a school teacher for African American children, she and other family members left for Canada following passage of the Fugitive Slave Act of 1850.  Settling in Ontario, she began publishing works to inform American blacks about conditions in Canada, so that they could judge whether migration there was in their interests.  This effort resulted in the founding of the Provincial Freeman, the first newspaper published by a black woman in North America, and the first by a woman in what is now Canada.  After the American Civil War, she returned to the United States, where she returned to teaching and continued to be active in civil rights.  She acquired a law degree in 1883.

See also

 African American history
 List of National Historic Landmarks in Washington, D.C.

References

African-American historic places
Houses on the National Register of Historic Places in Washington, D.C.
Italianate architecture in Washington, D.C.
National Historic Landmarks in Washington, D.C.
Individually listed contributing properties to historic districts on the National Register in Washington, D.C.
Houses completed in 1881
African-American Roman Catholicism
Women in Washington, D.C.